Sam Anderson, born Anderson Samuel is an Indian actor. He played the lead role in the Tamil film Yaarukku Yararo and became popular on the internet for his "feeble dance moves and feebler acting skills". His acting skills are frequently ridiculed in the social media, alongside fellow actor "Power Star" Srinivasan.

Early life
He was born in Erode, Tamil Nadu and originally ran a courier delivery business, with an employee base of five in Salem. Anderson was inspired by the Tamil film Chocolate (2001), and decided to turn his life towards the cinema industry. Before he worked as a staff in Time IIT coaching institution in erode.

Career
Anderson played the lead role David, in the film Yaaruku Yaaro, produced by his uncle, and released in four theatres in Tamil Nadu. For the sake of the film, Anderson Samuel changed his name to Sam Anderson, and practised acting, story-writing and dancing in front of a mirror.

Yaaruku Yaaro ran for 25 days in the 4 theatres released. The film was released in parts on YouTube, and "went viral" on the Internet.  Anderson states  "What is the secret of my success? It could be because everything went wrong in my first attempt".

After his debut, he appeared in many cameo roles in Tamil films.

Filmography
All films are in Tamil, unless otherwise noted.

References

External links
 

Tamil male actors
Indian male film actors
Living people
People from Erode district
Male actors in Tamil cinema
Indian male comedians
Tamil comedians
1977 births